Science College, Kokrajhar, established in 1995, is a general degree science college situated in Kokrajhar, Assam. This college is affiliated with the Gauhati University.

Departments

Science
Physics
Mathematics
Chemistry
Computer Science
Botany
Zoology
Physiotherapy
 I.T

References

External links

Universities and colleges in Assam
Colleges affiliated to Gauhati University
Educational institutions established in 1995
1995 establishments in Assam